Martin Luther Nesbitt Jr. (September 25, 1946 – March 6, 2014) was a Democratic member of the North Carolina Senate. He represented the 49th district (Buncombe County). An attorney from Asheville, North Carolina, Nesbitt was elected to eleven terms in the state House before moving to the state senate in 2004.

Political career
Nesbitt was first appointed to the House in 1979 to fill out the remainder of the term of his mother, Mary Cordell Nesbitt, who held the House seat until her death. Groomed by one of North Carolina's most famous and influential politicians, Liston Ramsey, Nesbitt rose to become an appropriations chairman and top budget writer in the 1990s. Former Speaker of the House Jim Black (who was later incarcerated) found disfavor with Nesbitt after Nesbitt challenged his power in the early 2000s.

In February 2004, Martin Nesbitt was appointed to the North Carolina Senate by Governor Mike Easley to fill the vacant seat left by the resignation of Steve Metcalf. 
After moving to the Senate, Nesbitt rose to become chairman of the powerful Judiciary I Civil Committee.

Nesbitt was unanimously elected majority leader on November 17, 2009, replacing Tony Rand. Prior to his election, he received an endorsement from Senate President Pro Tempore Marc Basnight, a powerful nod in North Carolina politics. After Democrats lost their Senate majority in the 2010 elections, Nesbitt was unanimously elected minority leader for the next legislature. He stepped down as minority leader in 2014 for health reasons, and was succeeded by Sen. Daniel T. Blue Jr. Within two days of resigning from the leadership, Nesbitt died.

Committees
Nesbitt was in several senate committees:
Appropriations/Base Budget
Commerce
Finance
Judiciary I
Mental Health & Youth Services
Redistricting
Rules and Operations of the Senate
State and Local Government

Education and personal life
Nesbitt earned his bachelor's degree from the University of North Carolina at Chapel Hill in 1970 and his law degree from UNC in 1973. He was married with two grown children and two grandchildren at the time of his death.

He died on March 6, 2014, one week after being diagnosed with stomach cancer. He was 67.

Electoral history

2012

2010

2008

2006

2004

2002

References

External links
Official site

|-

|-

|-

|-

|-

|-

Democratic Party North Carolina state senators
Democratic Party members of the North Carolina House of Representatives
North Carolina lawyers
2014 deaths
1946 births
University of North Carolina School of Law alumni
Politicians from Asheville, North Carolina
Deaths from stomach cancer
Deaths from cancer in North Carolina
21st-century American politicians
20th-century American lawyers